Eleni Peletidou (born 28 June 1980) is a Greek footballer who plays as a goalkeeper and has appeared for the Greece women's national team.

Career
Peletidou has been capped for the Greece national team, appearing for the team during the 2019 FIFA Women's World Cup qualifying cycle.

References

External links
 
 
 

1980 births
Living people
Greek women's footballers
Greece women's international footballers
Women's association football goalkeepers